Spirotropis badensis is an extinct species of sea snail, a marine gastropod mollusk in the family Drilliidae.

Description
The length of the shell attains 20mm, its diameter 8.5 mm.

Distribution
This extinct marine species was found in Middle Miocene strata in the Vienna Basin, Austria.

References

External links

badensis